Boston College Eagles radio networks are American broadcast radio networks heard in the 6 New England states on 15 stations (10 A.M., 5 F.M.).  The current sports teams that have radio networks are the men's basketball, hockey and football teams.  The network is produced through IMG College, a division of IMG Media.  The football play-by-play announcer is Jon Meterparel and the analyst is Peter Cronan.  The basketball play-by-play announcer is Ted Sarandis and the analyst is Bill Ebben.

Current radio affiliates

Former affiliates (3 stations)
WARL/1320: Attleboro, Massachusetts (2006 & 2009)
WCRN/830: Worcester, Massachusetts (2010)
WTSA/1450: Brattleboro, Vermont (2009)

References 

Boston College Eagles
College football on the radio
College basketball on the radio in the United States
Sports radio networks in the United States
Learfield IMG College sports radio networks